Jola Jobst (25 November 1915 – October 1952) was a German movie actress who committed suicide in 1952. Jobst was married to the World War II fighter pilot, Hermann Graf, from 1944 to 1949. Following her divorce she married the actor Wolfgang Kieling in 1950.

Selected filmography

Film
 Little Dorrit (1934)
 The Fight with the Dragon (1935)
 The King's Prisoner (1935)
 The Unsuspecting Angel (1936)
 Die große und die kleine Welt (1936)
 The Model Husband (1937)
 Die Fledermaus (1937)
 Unsere kleine Frau (1938)

References

Citation

Biography

External links
 

1952 suicides
Suicides in Germany
German film actresses
20th-century German actresses
1915 births